Duparquetia orchidacea is a liana which is native to tropical west Africa.  It is the only species in the subfamily Duparquetioideae. It is found in humid tropical forests in West and Central Africa. It is a basal member of the Fabaceae, as evidenced by the distinctive structure of its flowers and wood, and phylogenetic studies.

References

Fabaceae
Monotypic Fabaceae genera
Taxa named by Henri Ernest Baillon